Robert White Murdoch (17 August 1944 – 15 May 2001) was a Scottish professional footballer, who played for Celtic, Middlesbrough and Scotland. Murdoch was one of the Lisbon Lions, the Celtic team who won the European Cup in 1967. He later managed Middlesbrough.

Club career

Celtic 
Brought up in Rutherglen, he lived there for most of his life and attended local St. Columbkillle's Primary school (a classmate was Tommy McAvoy who went on to become the long-serving MP for the area), before moving to Our Lady's High Secondary in Motherwell. Murdoch first joined Celtic in 1959, earning £3 per week as a part-time player while also being employed as a sheet-metal worker. He played for junior club Cambuslang Rangers for two years to gain experience before joining Celtic as a full-time professional.

Murdoch initially played for Celtic as an inside right, but only showed signs of being a reasonable performer in that position. This was in a period where players were not well developed by Celtic due to a lack of quality coaching. Jock Stein moved Murdoch to right half soon after he was appointed Celtic manager in 1965. With that simple action, Murdoch was the first player to significantly benefit from Stein's arrival. Playing in the deeper position allowed Murdoch to use his long passing ability more effectively. He still continued to score a handful of goals a season, knocking in shots from cutbacks by Bertie Auld or Jimmy Johnstone.

During his time at Celtic, he won eight Scottish League titles, four Scottish Cups and five League Cups, as well as the 1967 European Cup Final winners' medal. Murdoch's shot was deflected by Stevie Chalmers to score Celtic's winning goal. Murdoch also played in the 1970 European Cup Final, when Celtic lost 2–1 to Feyenoord. In total, he made over 500 appearances for Celtic and scored approximately 100 goals.

His later years with Celtic were marked with injury problems, as Murdoch had difficulty maintaining his weight at a correct level. His importance to the success of a great Celtic team was such that when Jock Stein was asked when he thought Celtic might win the European Cup again he replied "when Bobby Murdoch is fit". Stein also credited Murdoch with being "just about the best player I had as a manager". Murdoch was voted Scottish player of the year in 1969 by the football writers. Stein allowed Murdoch to leave the club because he had "run out of challenges" at Celtic.

Middlesbrough 

Murdoch left Celtic in 1973 and joined Middlesbrough on a free transfer as Jack Charlton's first signing. He provided advice to the young Graeme Souness and the club was promoted to Division One in his first season there. He made 125 appearances for Middlesbrough before his playing retirement in 1976. Murdoch then took up the role of coaching Middlesbrough youth players. He had a brief, unsuccessful, spell as manager of Middlesbrough between 1981 and 1982. Murdoch left the club shortly after it was relegated to Division Two. His job at Middlesbrough had been made difficult by the fact that the club had sold star players such as Craig Johnston, David Armstrong and Mark Proctor

International career

Murdoch won a total of 12 caps for Scotland, having to compete for selection with Jim Baxter and then Billy Bremner among others. His debut was in a 1–0 victory against Italy on 9 October 1965 during 1966 FIFA World Cup qualification. His first two international goals came in his second cap, a 4–1 British Home Championship victory against Wales in the same month. He scored six international goals in total, including the equaliser in a 1–1 draw against West Germany in 1970 FIFA World Cup qualification.

Later life, death and legacy
Murdoch had an unsuccessful spell as a publican that ended in debt. In 1995, Murdoch won a legal case in a Medical Appeal Tribunal that an ankle injury he had sustained playing for Celtic was an industrial injury, entitling him to compensation from the state. In his last years he had a role helping at Celtic Park with match-day hospitality.

He died, aged 56, following a stroke, in the Glasgow Victoria Infirmary. He was survived by Kathleen – his wife since 1964 – and by a daughter and two sons. Murdoch was the first of the Lisbon Lions to die. In 2016 his contribution was recognised with the unveiling of a plaque listing his achievements at the town hall in his hometown of Rutherglen; the ceremony was attended by family members, local dignitaries and former teammates.

Murdoch's younger brothers Billy and James were also footballers; Billy was a reserve player at Celtic while Bobby played for Stenhousemuir and Kilmarnock. James aka Jimmy was also on Celtic's books as a youth before signing provisionally with Cardiff City, and played at Junior level for Cumbernauld United.

Career statistics

Club

1Includes Glasgow Cup (several years), the 1967–68 Intercontinental Cup and 1972–73 Drybrough Cup

International appearances

International goals
Scores and results list Scotland's goal tally first.

Honours

Club
Celtic
 European Cup: 1966–67
Runners-up 1969–70
 Intercontinental Cup: Runners-up 1967
 Scottish League Championship: 1965–66, 1966–67, 1967–68, 1968–69, 1969–70, 1970–71, 1971–72, 1972–73
 Scottish Cup: 1964–65, 1966–67, 1968–69, 1970–71, 1971–72
 Scottish League Cup: 1965–66, 1966–67, 1967–68, 1968–69, 1969–70
 Glasgow Cup: 1963–64, 1964–65, 1966–67, 1967–68, 1969–70

Middlesbrough
 Football League Second Division: 1973–74

International
Scotland
 British Home Championship: 1966–67

Individual
Scottish Football Writers' Player of the Year: 1968–69
Scottish Football Hall of Fame: posthumous inductee 2004

References

External links

Interview with Bobby Murdoch's wife Kathleen

Scottish Football Hall of Fame profile

1944 births
2001 deaths
Scottish footballers
Scottish football managers
Scottish Football League players
Scottish Junior Football Association players
Scottish Roman Catholics
English Football League players
Scotland international footballers
Celtic F.C. players
Middlesbrough F.C. players
Middlesbrough F.C. managers
Association football midfielders
Scottish Football Hall of Fame inductees
Sportspeople from Rutherglen
People educated at Our Lady's High School, Motherwell
Scottish Football League representative players
Cambuslang Rangers F.C. players
Scotland under-23 international footballers
Sheet metal workers
UEFA Champions League winning players
Middlesbrough F.C. non-playing staff
Footballers from South Lanarkshire